Sanjeeva Nayaka (Hindi: संजीव नायक; Kannada: ಸಂಜೀವ ನಾಯಕ) is an Indian lichenologist. He is Senior Principal Scientist at CSIR-National Botanical Research Institute (CSIR-NBRI), Lucknow. He is in charge of the lichenology laboratory. He serves as managing editor of the journal Cryptogam Biodiversity and Assessment, and editor of ILS eLetters, both published by the Indian Lichenological Society.

Career 
Nayaka was introduced to research during his graduate studies. He was a volunteer in the 'Western Ghats Biodiversity Inventory Programme'. He was awarded with a Summer Research Fellowship of Jawaharlal Nehru Centre for Advanced Scientific Research, Bangalore to study the lichens of Bangalore under Madhav Gadgil. After his post-graduation Nayaka moved to Lucknow to work with Dr. D.K. Upreti at CSIR-NBRI. Initially he worked as a project assistant on the All-India Coordinated Project on Taxonomy. During this period, he explored lichens of Himachal Pradesh. In 2001 he was appointed as a scientist at CSIR-NBRI.
 
Nayaka revised the genus Lecanora for his doctoral thesis under Upreti's supervision. He earned his Ph.D. from Dr. R. M. L. Awadh University, Faizabad. His research interests include taxonomy, biomonitoring and bioprospecting of lichens. Apart from Lecanora he has revised taxa such as Buellia, Lecidea, Phyllopsora and Rinodina. He has described 28 new lichen species and reported over 110 species as new distributional record. Nayaka travelled throughout India and published lichen floristic accounts for several regions. His major work involves lichens of Himachal Pradesh, Uttar Pradesh, Gujarat and Eastern Ghats. He surveyed various wildlife sanctuaries and national parks in India, and he has visited Antarctica twice to study its lichens and their ecophysiology. He has handled eight research projects as Principal Investigator and he is a co-Investigator on more than 25 projects. Nayaka published more than 200 research articles. He participated in national and international conferences and published about 180 abstracts. He authored or edited three books: A field Guide to the common Lichens of Corbett Tiger Reserve, Lichens of Uttar Pradesh, and Plant Diversity of Uttar Pradesh (Including Algae and Fungi).

Recognition 
 Fellow of Linnean Society, London (2021)
 Fellow of Mycological Society of India
 Fellow of International Society for Environmental Botanist (ISEB), India
 Life member of International Association for Lichenology

References 

1974 births
Indian ecologists
Indian taxonomists
Indian lichenologists
Living people
Scientists from Karnataka
20th-century Indian scientists
21st-century Indian scientists